The Brooklyn Heights Seminary was a private school in Brooklyn, New York.

Early history 
The Brooklyn Heights Seminary was founded by Alonzo Gray in 1851. It was an offshoot of the Brooklyn Female Academy (est. 1845), which eventually became the Packer Collegiate Institute. The school was originally located at 88 Montague Place, now known as Montague Street, in Brooklyn Heights, and later at 138-140 Montague Street. The original faculty consisted of Professor Gray, Miss Arethusa Hall, and twelve other teachers. 166 pupils enrolled in the school's first year. The school's "Board of Visitors" included many well-known Brooklynites of the time, including Henry Ward Beecher. Reverend Richard S. Storrs lectured at the school during its first year. He also served as temporary principal after Gray passed away in March 1861. In September 1861, the school was purchased by Dr. Charles E. West, who served as principal until his retirement in 1889. His assistant principal was Mary A. Brigham. Clara B. Colton took over leadership of the school in 1889, in partnership with three other faculty members. Colton retired in 1903.

Incorporation and later history 
Upon Colton's retirement, a committee composed of the school's patrons and the Brooklyn Heights Seminary Club incorporated the school under a Board of Trustees with Teunis G. Bergen as president. Ellen Yale Stevens was appointed as principal and the former Chittenden mansion at 18 Pierrepont Street was leased to house the school. In 1906 the Trustees purchased the property, and in 1907 a three-story extension was added with a gymnasium and classrooms. The extension was named Stanton Hall in memory of Mr. George A. Stanton.

In 1914 Florence Greer was appointed assistant principal. Greer became principal in 1923 and held the position until her death in 1933.

The school ceased to operate after Greer's death. Its building was demolished in 1934 to make way for apartment buildings.

Notable people

Alumnae
 Helen Twelvetrees
 Gertrude Niesen
 Elisabeth Achelis
 Helen Appleton Read
 Elizabeth W. Greenwood
 Josephine Perfect Bay
 Lavinia Goodell
 Anna Olcott Commelin
 Augusta Lewis Troup

Faculty 

 Mary A. Brigham
 Katharine Bement Davis

References 

Education in New York City